Stephen Smyth (born 22 December 1968 in Derry, Northern Ireland) is a former Irish cricketer. He was a left-handed batsman. He made his début for Ireland against Worcestershire in 1990, eventually playing for his country on 64 occasions, including five first-class and ten List A matches. He also represented Northern Ireland in the cricket tournament at the 1998 Commonwealth Games.

References

External links
Cricket Archive profile
Cricket Europe Stats Zone profile

1968 births
Living people
Irish cricketers
Cricketers at the 1998 Commonwealth Games
Cricketers from Northern Ireland
Sportspeople from Derry (city)
Commonwealth Games competitors for Northern Ireland